List of works by or about Karl Schroeder, Canadian author.

Novels

 --- (2015). Lady of Mazes. New York: Tor. 
 Crisis in Zefra (Directorate of Land Strategic Concepts, National Defence Canada; 2005.)  
 
--- (2018). The Million. New York: Tor.com. 
--- (2019). Stealing Worlds. New York: Tor. .

The Virga series
 Sun of Suns (Tor Books, 2006.)  
 Queen of Candesce (Tor Books, 2007.)  
 Pirate Sun (Tor Books, 2008.)  
 The Sunless Countries (Tor Books, 2009.)  
 Ashes of Candesce (Tor Books, 2012.)

Short fiction 
Stories

 "The Great Worm". (Pierian Spring, Fall 1983.)
 "The Pools of Air". (Tesseracts 3 anthology, Press Porcepic, 1991.) 
 "Hopscotch". (On Spec magazine, summer 1992.)
 "The Toy Mill" (with David Nickle). (Tesseracts 4 anthology, Beach Holme Press, 1992.) 
 "Solitaire". (Figment magazine; Fall/Winter 1992.)
 "The Cold Convergence". (Figment magazine, spring 1993.)
 "Making Ghosts". (On Spec, Hard SF Issue, spring 1994.)
 "The Engine of Recall". (Aboriginal SF, Winter 1997.)
 "Ball of Blood". (Horrors! 365 Scary Stories anthology, Barnes and Noble, 1997). 
 "Halo". (Tesseracts 5 anthology, Tesseract Books, 1996.) 
 "Dawn". (Tesseracts 7 anthology, Tesseract Books, 1999.) 
 "The Dragon of Pripyat" [ Gennady Malianov series]. (Tesseracts 8 anthology, Tesseract Books, 1999.) 
 "Allegiances". (The Touch: Epidemic of the Millennium. iBooks, 2000.)
 "Alexander's Road" [Gennady Malianov series] (2005)
 "The Engine of Recall" (collection) (Red Deer Press, 2005.)  
 "Book, Theatre, and Wheel". (Solaris Book of New SF #2, Solaris, 2008.)
 "To Hie from Far Cilenia" [Gennady Malianov series]. 2008; Metatropolis, Tor, 2010 
 "Mitigation". (Fast Forward #2, Pyr Books, 2009.)
 "Deodand".[Gennady Malianov series] 2010
 "Laika's Ghost" [Gennady Malianov series] (Engineering Infinity, edited by Jonathan Strahan, December 2010)
 "Jubilee" (Tor.com, 2014)
 "Kheldyu" [Gennady Malianov series] (Reach for Infinity, edited by Jonathan Strahan, May 2014)

Non-fiction
 Merry Christmas, You Ungrateful Bastards. (On Spec Summer 1993.)
 Warm Fuzziness: Quantum Mechanics and the New Age. (Transforum, August 1993.)
 Worldbuilding (SF Canada, Spring 1999.)
 The Complete Idiot's Guide to Publishing Science Fiction (with Cory Doctorow). (MacMillan, 2000.) 
 Traitor to Both Sides. (The New York Review of Science Fiction, April 2005.)

Critical studies and reviews of Schroeder's work

Notes

Bibliographies by writer
Bibliographies of Canadian writers
Science fiction bibliographies
Science fiction lists